Thomas or Tom Wills may refer to:

 Thomas Wills (minister) (1740–1802), English evangelical preacher
 Thomas Wills (politician) (1826–1907), politician from Ontario, Canada
 Thomas N. Wills (1866-1940), Arizona rancher and politician
 Thomas Wills (footballer) (1877–1912), Scottish footballer
 Tom Wills (1835–1880), cricketer and one of the inventors of Australian rules football
 Tom Wills, meteorologist with WAVE
 Tom Wills, news anchor with Florida television station WJXT
 Tom Wills Interchange, an interchange on the Eastlink M3 in Melbourne, Australia

See also
Thomas Willis (disambiguation)

Wills, Thomas